The ISPS Handa Global Cup was professional golf tournament on the Japan Golf Tour. Its main sponsor was International Sports Promotion Society (ISPS). Founded in 2015 as a 72-hole stroke play tournament, in 2017 it became a match play event and was renamed the ISPS Handa Match Play.

Winners

External links 
Coverage on the Japan Golf Tour's official site

International Sports Promotion Society
Former Japan Golf Tour events
Defunct golf tournaments in Japan
Sport in Yamanashi Prefecture
Recurring sporting events established in 2015
Recurring sporting events disestablished in 2018
2015 establishments in Japan
2018 disestablishments in Japan